NingboTech University (Traditional Chinese: 浙大寧波理工學院, Simplified Chinese: 浙大宁波理工学院), formerly known as Ningbo Institute of Technology, Zhejiang University (Traditional Chinese: 浙江大學寧波理工學院, Simplified Chinese: 浙江大学宁波理工学院), is a public university which transformed from an independent technical college formerly affiliated to the Zhejiang University in 2019. It is located in the Ningbo Higher Education District (寧波高等教育園區/宁波高等教育园区), Ningbo City, Zhejiang Province, People's Republic of China. It shares the Ningbo Campus with Zhejiang University. It was founded in June 2001, and mainly focuses on undergraduate education following the course of Zhejiang University.

References

External links
 Ningbo Institute of Technology, Zhejiang University (Chinese Homepage)

Former affiliates of Zhejiang University
Ningbo Campus, Zhejiang University
Universities and colleges in Zhejiang